VSB may refer to:

 Vancouver School Board, common name for School District 39 Vancouver, British Columbia
 Finno-Soviet Treaty of 1948, the basis for Finno–Soviet relations from 1948 to 1992
 United Swiss Railways, a former railway company in Switzerland
 Vestigial sideband, in radio communications, a sideband that has been only partly cut off or suppressed
 Very small business, companies that are at the lower end, in terms of size, to companies that are considered small and medium enterprise
 Villanova School of Business at Villanova University, Philadelphia, Pennsylvania
 Virginia State Bar, the Bar Association of the Commonwealth of Virginia
 Völkisch-Social Bloc, a right-wing electoral alliance in post World War I Germany
 VSB-TV, a defunct NBC affiliate in Bermuda
 VSB, (voltage standby), a power supply line on an ATX motherboard form factor that stays active when the power supply is not active
 Technical University of Ostrava, in the city of Ostrava, Czech Republic
 Space Quest: Vohaul Strikes Back, a fan-made sequel to the Space Quest video game series
 VSB, Scouting bombing plane, United States Navy acronym